Association for Serb Liberation and Unification or Society for Serb Liberation and Unification (Друштво за ослобођење и уједињење српско), commonly known as "the Association", was a Serb revolutionary organisation (national liberation movement) based in Cetinje, established in 1871, with the aim of liberating Serb-inhabited territories from the hands of the Ottoman Empire. The Association founded several boards (odbori): in Cetinje, in Novi Sad, and in Belgrade. At the same time, the Main Board for Serb Liberation (Главни одбор за српско ослобођење was established in Kragujevac with the same goals.

History
The Association was founded by members of the "United Serbian Youth" (Уједињена омладина српска) and other patriots from all over the Yugoslav lands. This was secretly done after the baptism of Montenegrin Prince Nicholas' daughter.

Members
Prince Nicholas I of Montenegro
Milan Kostić
Miša Dimitrijević
Milan Kujundžić Aberdar
Vasa Pelagić
Svetozar Marković
Jovan Sundečić
Đorđe Đorđević Vojnović, son of Montenegrin-Russian noble and artillery commander Đorđe Vojnović.

See also
Serb revolutionary organizations

References

Serbian revolutionary organizations
Organizations established in 1871
1871 establishments in Montenegro
1871 establishments in Serbia
Cetinje
1871 establishments in the Ottoman Empire
Ottoman Serbia
Serbian nationalism
Ottoman period in the history of Montenegro
Principality of Serbia
Principality of Montenegro
Serb organizations
Revolutionary organizations against the Ottoman Empire